Becky Sullivan is a Supervising Sound Editor. She won the BAFTA for her work on the film  The Fugitive. Sullivan was nominated at the 87th Academy Awards in the category of Best Sound Editing for her work on the film Unbroken. Her nomination was shared with Andrew DeCristofaro.

References

External links
 

Sound editors
Living people
Best Sound BAFTA Award winners
Year of birth missing (living people)
Place of birth missing (living people)
Women sound editors